Gamecity LifeStyle Shopping Mall is a lifestyle shopping mall located in Gaborone, Botswana. Currently it has 126 shops, with more available by mid-2014.

The property is owned and managed by Turnstar Holdings Limited, Botswana.

Notable retailers include:
 Checkers Hyper - groceries
 Woolworths - groceries, clothing
 Edgars - clothing, cosmetics
 Mr. Price - clothing
 Choppies - information technology
 Toys "R" Us - toys
 Ster-Kinekor - movies

Stuttafords was previously an anchor department store until its closing in 2017.

Notable restaurants:
 KFC
 Wimpy
 Nando's

Notable banks:
 BancABC
 Barclays Bank
 First National Bank
 Stanbic Bank
 Standard Chartered Bank

References

External links
Turnstar Holdings Limited

Buildings and structures in Gaborone
Shopping malls in Botswana